This is a list of members of the Australian House of Representatives from 1969 to 1972, as elected at the 1969 federal election.

 Labor member Jim Fraser died on 1 April 1970; Labor candidate Kep Enderby won the resulting by-election on 30 May 1970.
 Liberal member Sir Wilfrid Kent Hughes died on 30 July 1970; Liberal candidate Tony Staley won the resulting by-election on 19 September 1970.
 Country Party member Sir John McEwen resigned on 1 February 1971; Country Party candidate Bruce Lloyd won the resulting by-election on 20 March 1971.

References

Members of Australian parliaments by term
20th-century Australian politicians